Senator Newcomb may refer to:

Horatio C. Newcomb (1821–1882), Indiana State Senate
Josiah T. Newcomb (1868–1944), New York State Senate